Shorkot is a tehsil in Jhang District, Punjab, Pakistan. It is subdivided into 29 Union Councils. The city of Shorkot is the headquarters of the tehsil.

Language 
A Punjabi Dialect of Jhangochi is spoken by majority of the people in the rural areas but in the cities, mainstream Punjabi language is spoken.

Tourist attractions
 Mazar (Shrine) of Sultan Bahu - a 17th-century scholar and Sufi poet.

Notable people 

Muhammad Arif Khan Rajbana Sial
Sahibzada Nazir Sultan

References

Jhang District
Tehsils of Punjab, Pakistan